Hans Schmitz (1896–1986) was a German politician. 

Hans Schmitz may also refer to:

Hans Schmitz-Wiedenbrück (1907–1944), a German painter of sacral, peasant and Nazi propaganda arts